Oryslava Chukhlib (born 2 August 1974) is a Ukrainian luger. She competed in the women's singles event at the 2002 Winter Olympics.

References

External links
 

1974 births
Living people
Ukrainian female lugers
Olympic lugers of Ukraine
Lugers at the 2002 Winter Olympics
Sportspeople from Lviv